Skik is a Dutch pop group, originating from the town of Erica, Drenthe. The band mainly sings in Drèents, a variation of Low-Saxon, which is traditionally spoken in Drenthe. Skik is Drèents for fun or enjoyment.

Biography 
Skik's first performance was in 1994, on Muzem, a festival dedicated to the dialect, in Emmen, Netherlands. Later they got several hits, including Op Fietse (Gone cycling) and Hoe kan dat nou? (How come?). These two songs are both from their first popular album, Niks Is Zoas 't Lek (Nothing's the way it seems to be). The follow-up of this album, 's Nachts (At night), produces the hits 't Giet Zoas 't Giet (It goes the way it goes) and Af & Toe (Now & Then).

The CD Overal & Nergens (Everywhere & Nowhere) meant a breaking of the ties with the Drèents, which resulted in a song in ABN (Broadcast Dutch). Ik Ga Als Een Speer made it to the charts, but no of the other songs did. The next song of theirs that made it into the charts was Ik heb geen zin om op te staan, which they recorded together with Henk Westbroek. Their next and fifth CD, Tof (Awesome) brought along the single-CD Dankjewel Voor De Zon (Thanks for the sun), which featured a video clip made by students of the HKU.

In 2004 the compilation-CD Best Tof (Kinda Cool), a play on Best of, was published. The group was on a promotion tour for the CD until September that same year. After that, Skik was less noticeable, as band leader Daniël Lohues was going solo with the 'Louisiana Blues Club'. On the first of Oktober 2006 the group performed on a surprise party for the 25-year anniversary of De Dijk, another Dutch band. Skik performed the song Stampvol Café for the occasion.

Discography

Albums

Skik (1995) 
 Ik heb wel's zo'n dag
 Tomme
 Protestsong
 Jelle Skai & Eppie D.
 Niks meer te vertellen
 Doe niet net asof
 De man
 Dreuge worst
 Betonpaolties
 Ben d'r flauw van
 As ik joe nie had
 Klotenweer
 Naor huus
 bonus: Mick & Keith (wie kent ze niet)

Niks is zoas 't lek (1997) 
 Nie veur spek & bonen
 Ik kan't nie wachten
 Niks is zoas 't lek
 Hoe kan dat nou?
 Makluk zat
 Beter nooit dan ooit
 Op fietse
 Absoluut, misschien
 Wachten op de zunne
 Cowboys & Indiaans
 We zullen 't wel zien
 Kabaal aal
 bonus: Nico en Rob, wie kent ze niet

's Nachts (1999) 
 't Is mij allemaol wel best
 Waor ben ik met bezig?!
 't Giet zoas 't giet
 Laot mar kommen
 Overneij
 's nachts
 Af & toe
 Echt nie!
 Ik ben zo bliede
 De buie
 Elke weg
 'k heb 't licht nog an
 De schipper & de duuvel
 Bonus: Backing track 's Nachts

Overal & Nergens (2000) 
 Overal & Nergens
 Ik ga als 'n speer
 Logisch Toch (of niet)?
 Wie het weet mag het zeggen
 Over Stilte en Lawaai
 Amsterdam
 Ik wil weg
 Niks aan doen
 Als je ontevreden bent
 Hersenpan vol blues
 Je vindt me toch niet

Tof (2002) 
 Tof
 Land van melk & honing, wiet & witte wijn
 Doe mij maar jou
 Dankjewel voor de zon
 Over jou
 Ter voorkoming van misverstanden
 Anniek
 Verliefd
 Blablabla
 Honingbij
 Canadian Girl
 Alles gaat voorbij

Best Tof (2004) 
 Tomme
 Naor huus
 As ik joe nie had
 Niks is zoas 't lek
 Hoe kan dat nou
 Makluk zat
 Op fietse
 't Giet zo as 't giet
 's Nachts
 Af & toe
 Ik ben zo bliede
 Als ik wil...
 Ik ga als een speer
 Je vindt me toch niet
 Dankjewel voor de zon
 Alles gaat voorbij
 Tof
 Is dit alles (Doe Maar tribute)
 Zo vrolijk (Live versie, radio 2 gala)
 Grachten van Amsterdam

Singles 
 Tomme
 bonustracks: Altied Te Laat; Elvis (As Ik Um Was); Eppie D. & Jelle Skai (Live)
 Klotenweer - nieuwe versie
 bonustrack: Nije Skoene
 Niks Meer Te Vertellen
 bonustracks: Teddybeere
 Ik Wil Weg
 (bonustrack: Als We Zo Doorgaan)
 (bonus: Videoclips Ik Ga Als Een Speer & De Kat, De Eend & De Mens)
 Ik heb geen zin om op te staan - single met Henk Westbroek
 bonus: Niets Is Onmogelijk - met Henk Westbroek
 Verliefd
 bonustrack: Zo Vrolijk? (Live Radio 2 Gala)
 Grachten Van Amsterdam
 bonustrack: Stan Meyers Blues

Other 
There are two more songs by Skik that aren't distributed, and that can't be found on regular CD's. These are: De Sneij (The Snow), which was published as an addition to the VPRO Christmas CD in 1998, and Woar Ben Ik Mee Bezig (What Am I Doing), which had an alternative version published on the CD Twee Meter Sessies NL 1.

Trivia 
 The song Op Fietse describes a tour by bicycle through South-East Drenthe, which is the area in which lead singer  was born. The Drenthe Office of Tourism (VVV) later made this into a real route: "the Skik-route"
 Op Fietse was used for two Dutch TV commercials. The first of which was one for Calvé, a Dutch brand of peanut butter dating back to 2005. It would later also be used in an advertisement for ING, a major bank in the Netherlands.
 The single-version of Hoe Kan Dat Nou later got Niks is Zoas 't Lek as bonus track added on its CD.
 Guitarist Marco Geerdink is a nephew of frontman Daniël Lohues and played in Gimme Shelter, a Rolling Stones-cover band. He replaced Despo Kristel during the comeback of The Schizo's. Lohues said in an interview that The Shizo's were a major source of inspiration for all bands from Drenthe.

References 
 List of bands from the Netherlands

External links 
 

Dutch pop music groups